"Nihilist Blues" (stylised in all lowercase) is a song by British rock band Bring Me the Horizon featuring Canadian singer Grimes. Produced by the band's vocalist Oliver Sykes and keyboardist Jordan Fish, it is featured on the group's 2019 sixth studio album Amo. The track was released as the fifth single from the album on 24 January 2019. Evanescence have a songwriting credit on "Nihilist Blues" as the song lifts a vocal melody from their song "Never Go Back".

Composition and lyrics
"Nihilist Blues" has been described as a synth-pop, electronic rock, electropop, and trance song. The song talks principally about nihilism, focusing on the meaninglessness of life, existential crises and pessimism. According to an interview from Impericon, the song is Oliver Sykes' personal favourite one. Musically, "Nihilist Blues" sets inspiration from old disco and EDM songs. Fish commented about the collaboration:

Music video
The music video for "Nihilist Blues" was released on the same day as the single was streamed. It is an effects-laden music video directed by Polygon. AltPress described it as "a glitchy new way forward for frontman Oli Sykes and his band of Bring Me the Horizon rockers".

Personnel
Credits adapted from Tidal.

Bring Me the Horizon
 Oliver Sykes – lead vocals
 Jordan Fish – keyboards, programming, percussion, backing vocals
 Lee Malia – guitars
 Matt Kean – bass
 Matt Nicholls – drums

Additional musicians

 Grimes – vocals
 Madilyn Eve Cutter – cello
 Gavin Kibble – cello
 Rachael Lander – cello
 Max Ruisi – cello
 Choir Noir – choir vocals
 Jessica Price – double bass
 Lewis Reed – double bass
 Alexander Verster – double bass
 Oliver Hickie – French horn
 Simon Dobson – strings, trumpet
 Parallax Orchestra – strings
 Ross Anderson – trombone
 Jane Salmon – trombone
 Victoria Rule – trumpet
 Anisa Arslanagic – viola
 Mark Gibbs – viola
 Benjamin Kaminski – viola

Additional personnel

 Dan Lancaster – mixing
 Rhys May – mixing
 Ted Jensen – mastering
 Roman Dodangoda – engineering
 Peter Miles – engineering
 Robbie Nelson – engineering
 Alejandro Baima – assistant engineering
 Francesco Cameli – assistant engineering
 Daniel Morris – assistant engineering
 Conor Panayi – assistant engineering

Charts

References

2019 singles
2019 songs
Bring Me the Horizon songs
Electronic rock songs
RCA Records singles
Songs written by Oliver Sykes
Sony Music singles
Songs written by Amy Lee
Songs written by Terry Balsamo
Songs written by Tim McCord
Songs written by Will Hunt